The 1993 Portuguese Grand Prix was a Formula One motor race held at Estoril on 26 September 1993. It was the fourteenth round of the 1993 Formula One season. Michael Schumacher took his only win of the season, the second win of his career, while second place was enough for Alain Prost to clinch the championship, after Ayrton Senna's engine failed. Senna was out-qualified by his new team-mate, future champion Mika Häkkinen, but the Finnish driver crashed out. In a reversal of Hungary, Damon Hill stalled on the dummy grid and started from the back. The BMS Scuderia Italia team withdrew from the championship after this race.

Report

Two major news stories broke as the teams descended on Estoril: Prost announcing his retirement at the end of the season and Andretti leaving McLaren and being replaced by Häkkinen.

The Williamses were 1-2 in qualifying ahead of the McLarens but Hill, desperate to keep his Championship hopes alive took pole from Prost, with Häkkinen surprisingly ahead of Senna with Alesi and Schumacher behind. However, Hill's engine refused to fire on the parade lap and he had to start at the back. At the start, Prost got squeezed out by the McLarens and Alesi, with Alesi getting ahead of the McLarens with Senna ahead of Häkkinen. Alesi led Senna, Häkkinen, Prost, Schumacher and Berger.

The top six stayed together but the Williamses and Schumacher were on a one-stop strategy unlike the McLarens and Ferraris. On lap 20, Senna's engine blew as Alesi, Häkkinen and Schumacher pitted, with Alesi losing out to both. This left Prost leading from Blundell, Hill, Häkkinen, Schumacher and Alesi. Schumacher passed Häkkinen on lap 25 and pulled away. Prost would stop on lap 29 but Schumacher would rejoin ahead. When Hill stopped as well, Schumacher was leading from Prost, Häkkinen, Hill, Alesi and Berger.

On lap 33, Häkkinen crashed into the wall at the last corner. Three laps later, Berger's suspension failed dramatically at the exit of the pitlane, sending him across the start-finish straight, being nearly hit by a Footwork. Blundell crashed from sixth on lap 52 as Prost began to hassle Schumacher. However, second place was enough for Prost to win the championship, so the French driver did not take any risks. Patrese was fifth but he too crashed on lap 64 into the Footwork of Derek Warwick forcing both drivers to retire. Schumacher had a minor off but still just kept his lead. Schumacher won from new World Champion Prost, Hill, Alesi, Wendlinger and Brundle.

With only two more races to go, Prost was the World Champion with 87 points but there was battle for second between Hill, Senna and Schumacher. Hill was second with 62, Senna was third with 53 and Schumacher was fourth with 52. Behind, Patrese was fifth with 20, Alesi was sixth with 13, Brundle was seventh with 12 and Herbert was eighth with 11. In the Constructors Championship, Williams were the World Champions with 149 points but there was a battle for second between Benetton with 72 and McLaren with 60. Ferrari were fourth with 23.

Classification

Qualifying

Race

Championship standings after the race
 Bold Text indicates World Champions.

Drivers' Championship standings

Constructors' Championship standings

 Note: Only the top five positions are included for both sets of standings.

References

Portuguese Grand Prix
Portuguese Grand Prix
Grand Prix
Portuguese Grand Prix